Hamilton Corner is an unincorporated community in Payette County, Idaho, United States, about  east-southeast of New Plymouth.

Hamilton Corner is located at the junction of Idaho State Highway 52 and Idaho State Highway 72 (SH-72). However, the entire length of SH-72 was part of a former routing of US 30 (US 30). In addition, Sand Hollow Road (also known as Old Highway 30), which runs south from the community, was also part of the former routing of US 30.

See also

References

Unincorporated communities in Idaho
Unincorporated communities in Payette County, Idaho